The discography of American rock band Black Veil Brides consists of 6 studio albums, 3 extended plays, 23 singles, 20 music videos, and 1 short film.

Albums

Studio albums

Video albums

Re-recordings

Extended plays

Singles

Other charted songs

Videography

Music videos

Short films

Other appearances

References 

Discographies of American artists
Rock music discographies
discography